Nikolaj Misiuk (born 4 January 1987) is a Lithuanian footballer who plays as a forward. Born in Vilnius, he made 58 appearances in the A Lyga for Žalgiris, FBK Kaunas and Tauras Tauragė. Misiuk also played in the Meistriliiga for Narva Trans and the Belarusian Premier League for Neman Grodno. In 2011, he made one appearance in the second qualifying round of the UEFA Europa League, and spent time on trial with Plymouth Argyle.

References

External links
 
 

1987 births
Living people
Lithuanian footballers
Association football forwards
Lithuanian expatriate footballers
Expatriate footballers in Russia
Expatriate footballers in Greece
Expatriate footballers in Poland
Expatriate footballers in Estonia
Expatriate footballers in Belarus
Expatriate footballers in Cyprus
FK Žalgiris players
FC Tom Tomsk players
Doxa Drama F.C. players
Znicz Pruszków players
JK Narva Trans players
FC Neman Grodno players
FBK Kaunas footballers
FK Tauras Tauragė players
Zagłębie Sosnowiec players
FK Riteriai players
Meistriliiga players
Lithuanian expatriate sportspeople in Belarus
Lithuanian expatriate sportspeople in Cyprus
Lithuanian expatriate sportspeople in Estonia
Lithuanian expatriate sportspeople in Greece
Lithuanian expatriate sportspeople in Poland
Lithuanian expatriate sportspeople in Russia